Denys Neil Coop (20 July 1920 – 16 August 1981) was an English camera operator and cinematographer. He was a president of the British Society of Cinematographers from 1973 to 1975.

Coop was best known for his works on the film Superman (1978), for which he and his team won the Special Achievement Academy Award and the Michael Balcon Award.

Early life and career
He began his career in the cinema as apprentice to Freddie Young. In the 1960s he was Director of Photography on films such as A Kind of Loving (1962), This Sporting Life (1963), Billy Liar (1963) and Bunny Lake Is Missing (1965).

Awards and nominations
In 1979, he was one of a team of artists to win a special Oscar for visual effects in Superman.

In addition to the Oscar, Coop was also awarded a BAFTA (the Michael Balcon award) for his work on Superman (as Creative Director of Process Photography). He was also awarded the Bert Easey award by the British Society of Cinematographers.

He was nominated for the Best Cinematography (B&W) BAFTA in 1964 for Billy Liar, in 1965 for King and Country, and in 1967 for Bunny Lake is Missing. His black and white cinematography on films such as these, and This Sporting Life amongst others earned him the reputation as one of the finest B&W cinematographers of his generation.

Personal
He has been followed into the film industry by his son, Trevor Coop (Camera Operator), and his three grandchildren, Jason Coop (focus puller), Gareth Coop (Clapper Loader), and Amy Coop (Assistant Director)

References

External links
Denys Coop at the Internet Encyclopedia of Cinematographers

1920 births
1981 deaths
Special Achievement Academy Award winners
British cinematographers
BAFTA winners (people)